Admiral William Oswald Story, CBE (April 1859 – 14 January 1938) was an Royal Navy and Royal Canadian Navy officer.

Biography 
The son of Joseph Story, of Bingfield, County Cavan, William Oswald Story joined the Royal Navy in 1872, joining the Britannia as a cadet. As a midshipman in HMS Modeste, he took part in the Perak Expedition of 1875–76. He then took part in the Anglo-Egyptian War of 1882 as a sub-lieutenant on the gunboat HMS Mosquito and commanded a landing party at Chalof, for which he was specially commended in despatches and specially promoted to lieutenant the same year. He again saw service in the Suakin Expedition of 1884, as a lieutenant on HMS Dryad.

Promoted to commander in 1896 and captain in 1902, Story successively commanded HMS Hearty from 1900 to 1902, HMS Narcissus from 1903 to 1905, HMS Grafton from 1905 to 1906, HMS Cumberland from 1906 to 1907, HMS London from 1907 to 1908, and HMS Canopus from 1908 to 1909. He was Rear-Admiral-in-Charge of the Eastern Coast Guard District from 1909 to 1911. He was promoted to rear-admiral in 1911 and retired at his own request in 1912, settling in Guelph, Ontario.

On the outbreak of the First World War in 1914, Story offered his services and was appointed Admiral-Superintendent, Esquimalt Dockyard, in the Royal Canadian Navy, as well as Senior Naval Officer West Coast. From 1918 to 1919, he was Admiral-Superintendent, Halifax Dockyard. He was promoted to vice-admiral on the Retired List in 1917 and admiral on the Retired List in 1919. For his service during the war, Story was appointed a CBE in 1920. He also received the French Legion of Honour, the Japanese Order of the Rising Sun, and the Spanish Order of Naval Merit.

In retirement, Story, the only full admiral living in Canada, eventually settled in Montreal, and was involved in various patriotic organisations until his death in 1938.

Family 
Story married Olave Janet Baldwin, daughter of Captain Baldwin of Dunedin, New Zealand, in 1891; they had three sons and seven daughters.

References 

1859 births
1938 deaths
Commanders of the Order of the British Empire
Royal Navy admirals
British expatriates in Canada
Recipients of the Order of the Rising Sun
Recipients of the Legion of Honour
Royal Navy personnel of the Anglo-Egyptian War